The Rocky Mountain Group is a geologic group in Alberta. It preserves fossils dating back to the Permian period.

See also

 List of fossiliferous stratigraphic units in Alberta

References
 

Carboniferous Alberta